Spooky the Tuff Little Ghost is a fictional character that appeared in titles published by Harvey Comics.  Spooky first appeared in Casper the Friendly Ghost #10 (June 1953). He is Casper's cousin, although their exact relation is never specified.  He generally resembles Casper except he has freckles, a derby hat, and a large, black nose.

Overview
Spooky is written with a Brooklyn accent, for example calling his girlfriend and fellow ghost Pearl, "Poil." His iconic derby hat is, therefore, a "doiby."  Although he shares traits with The Ghostly Trio as far as loving to scare the living and being somewhat of a tough guy, he is not as cruel to his cousin as the Trio is, though he occasionally makes fun of Casper for being friendly, and Spooky has his moments of goodwill.

Pearl, who fell in love with Spooky when he rescued her from captivity by abusive witches who were enslaving her in her own house in one comic-book issue, is always trying to stop him from scaring, by reprimanding him, keeping an eagle-eye on him, staying with him all day, threatening to break up with him, or dating other ghost-guys. (Whenever she does, she always ends up finding fault with her new date and thinking Spooky is better by comparison, so she returns to him.) So Spooky is always finding ways to keep his scaring secret from Pearl, sometimes by making it appear that someone else did it.

After several appearances in Casper the Friendly Ghost, Spooky moved to several spin-off titles, including Spooky Spooktown (1961–1976), Spooky Haunted House (1972-1975) and Tuff Ghosts Starring Spooky (1962–1972). The original ran until #161 in September, 1980.

In other media
Spooky made four theatrical films with Casper, Hide & Shriek (1954),  Hooky Spooky (1957), Which Is Witch (1958), & Doing What's Fright (1959).

Spooky is part of the 1963 animated television series The New Casper Cartoon Show, which ran from 1963 to 1969.

In 1996, after the success of the 1995 Casper feature film, a new animated show, The Spooktacular New Adventures of Casper, premiered on Fox Kids, with Spooky as one of the regular characters, voiced by Rob Paulsen. In the 2000 computer-animated movie Casper's Haunted Christmas, Spooky's voice was provided by Samuel Vincent.

Spooky made an appearance in "Scare Bud", a fourth season episode of Harvey Girls Forever!, voiced by Jordan Fry.

See also
List of ghosts

References

External links
Spooky at The Harveyville Fun Times
Spooky at Don Markstein's Toonopedia

Harvey Comics titles
Comics characters introduced in 1953
Fictional characters from New York City
Harvey Comics series and characters
Fictional ghosts
Adventure comics
Humor comics
DreamWorks Classics
Casper characters